Croggan is a small scattered settlement on the Loch Spelve sealoch, in the south of the Isle of Mull, Argyll and Bute, Scotland. It is located in the Torosay parish. The nearest village is Lochbuie.

References

External links
Undiscovered Scotland

Villages on the Isle of Mull